Adel Ahmad (born 10 November 1990) is a Qatari footballer who plays for Al Bidda as a striker.

References 

1990 births
Living people
Qatari footballers
Naturalised citizens of Qatar
Footballers at the 2010 Asian Games
Al-Gharafa SC players
Al-Wakrah SC players
Al Sadd SC players
Lekhwiya SC players
Al Ahli SC (Doha) players
Al-Khor SC players
Al Bidda SC players
Al-Shamal SC players
Qatari people of Somali descent
Qatar Stars League players
Qatari Second Division players
Association football forwards
Asian Games competitors for Qatar